The Kastellorizo Folk Art Museum is a museum in the small island of Kastellorizo, Greece, housed in a historical Ottoman-era mosque that was known as the Kavos Mosque or simply the Kastellorizo Mosque.

Description 
Located on the tip of the small peninsula that forms the neighbourhood of Kavos, the island's only mosque, coloured in beige and red colors, was erected on the site of a previous Christian church dedicated to Saint Paraskevi. It was built in 1775. Since July 2007, it houses the Historical Collection of Kastellorizo, mostly consisting of old photographs, pictures, and documents recording the history of Kastellorizo from the nineteenth century until its destruction in 1943 during World War II and 1948, when the island along with the rest of the Dodecanese archipelago joined the rest of Greece, following a brief period under Italian rule.

See also 

 Islam in Greece
 List of former mosques in Greece
 Chios Byzantine Museum
 Ottoman Greece

References 

Museums in the South Aegean
Former mosques in Greece
Ottoman mosques in Greece
Mosque buildings with domes
18th-century mosques
18th-century architecture in Greece
Mosques completed in the 1770s